Kista Galleria is a shopping mall located in the Kista Science City in Stockholm, Sweden. It has 185 stores, including a multiplex, bowling alley, karting track and restaurants. Known for its generous opening hours (9 AM to 9 PM), it has been the most visited mall in Stockholm with approximately 18 million customers annually, and the third largest in terms of sales.

The shopping mall has 2,500 parking spaces and is situated between two major motorways, E18 and E4. Public transport is close, with entrances in the west leading directly to the Kista metro station. A light rail line is planned to be built in 2016.

From 2014, it has also been hosting the Kista bibliotek, the City of Stockholm Public Library - Kista Branch, which has been named as "Public library of the year 2015" by International Federation of Library Associations and Institutions (IFLA).

The mall is currently managed by Kista Galleria KB, which is co-owned by Finnish real estate company Citycon and Canadian CPP Investment Board.

Compared to other malls in the City of Stockholm

Kista Galleria is the biggest shopping mall in the City of Stockholm with 185 stores and restaurants while for instance Gallerian at Norrmalm has 83.

See also 
 List of shopping centres in Sweden

References

External links

 

Shopping centres in Sweden
Shopping malls established in 1977
1977 establishments in Sweden
Buildings and structures in Stockholm